Bar Aftab-e Olya (also Romanized as Bar Āftāb-e ‘Olyā; also known as Bar Āftāb-e Bālā) is a village in Seyyedvaliyeddin Rural District, Sardasht District, Dezful County, Khuzestan Province, Iran. At the 2006 census, its population was 121, in 24 families.

References 

Populated places in Dezful County